Stephen James Butcher (born 19 November 1994) is an English semi-professional footballer who plays at right-back for Ramsgate.

Playing career
Butcher made his debut for Gillingham on 3 August 2013, replacing Matt Fish five minutes into a 1–0 defeat to Colchester United at Priestfield Stadium. In March 2014 Butcher joined Maidstone United on loan until the end of the season, and following his release from Gillingham he joined the Stones on a permanent deal in June 2014.

Statistics

References

External links

1994 births
Living people
English footballers
Association football fullbacks
Gillingham F.C. players
English Football League players
Maidstone United F.C. players
Sportspeople from Dover, Kent
Footballers from Kent